Lucas Nahuel Arzamendia (born 23 February 1999) is an Argentine professional footballer who plays as a defender for Boca Juniors.

Career
Arzamendia began his career with Boca Juniors. In 2019, Arzamendia joined Cerro Largo of the Uruguayan Primera División on loan. He made his debut in senior football in February against Danubio, coming off the substitutes bench after sixty-two minutes in place of Facundo Rodríguez in a 2–0 win. A total of five appearances arrived for him in Uruguay, though he started just once; against Rampla Juniors on 10 August.

Career statistics
.

References

External links

1999 births
Living people
Footballers from Buenos Aires
Argentine footballers
Association football defenders
Argentine expatriate footballers
Expatriate footballers in Uruguay
Argentine expatriate sportspeople in Uruguay
Uruguayan Primera División players
Boca Juniors footballers
Cerro Largo F.C. players